The following television stations broadcast on digital channel 43 in the United States:

 K43HD-D in Quanah, Texas, to move to channel 35
 K43JE-D in Lake Crystal, Minnesota, to move to channel 25
 K43JQ-D in Bismarck, North Dakota, to move to channel 23
 K43LK-D in Lawton, Oklahoma, to move to channel 34
 K43MH-D in Vesta, Minnesota, to move to channel 34, on virtual channel 50

The following stations, which are no longer licensed, formerly broadcast on digital channel 43 in the U.S.:
 K43AG-D in Edwards, California
 K43ED-D in New Mobeetie, Texas
 K43EG-D in Pitkin, Colorado
 K43LV-D in Chalfant Valley, California
 K43NU-D in Follett, Texas
 K43NZ-D in Port Orford, Oregon
 KBMT-LD in Beaumont, Texas
 W43DL-D in Montgomery, Alabama
 WADA-LD in Wilmington, North Carolina
 WBTD-LD in Suffolk, Virginia
 WLEP-LD in Erie, Pennsylvania
 WPBO in Portsmouth, Ohio

References

43 digital